Henry Metcalf (20 April 1878 –   3 March 1966) was a South African international rugby union player who played as a forward.

He made 1 appearance for South Africa in 1903.

References

South African rugby union players
South Africa international rugby union players
People from Theewaterskloof Local Municipality
1878 births
1966 deaths
Rugby union forwards